The 1976 FIBA European Championship for Cadettes was the first edition of the European basketball championship for U16 women's teams, today known as FIBA U16 Women's European Championship. 16 teams featured in the competition, held in Szczecin, Poland from 14 to 22 August 1976.

The Soviet Union won their first title.

Participating teams

First round
In the first round, fifteen teams (all of them except Poland, with a bye to the Final Round as hosts) were allocated in five groups of three teams each. The top teams of each group qualified for the Final Round. The last two teams of each group played the Classification Round.

Group A

|

|}

Group B

|

|}

Group C

|

|}

Group D

|

|}

Group E

|

|}

Classification round
Ten advancing teams from the First Round were allocated in two groups of five teams each. Group 1 decided the 7th-11th place. Group 2 decided the 12th-16th place.

Group 1

|

|}

Group 2

|

|}

Final round
The five Preliminary Round group winners and Poland (as hosts) played the Final Round. The winner of the group wins the tournament.

|

|}

Final standings

External links
Official Site

FIBA U16 Women's European Championship
1976–77 in European women's basketball
Bask
International youth basketball competitions hosted by Poland
International women's basketball competitions hosted by Poland